
Gmina Piątek is a rural gmina (administrative district) in Łęczyca County, Łódź Voivodeship, in central Poland.

Villages
Gmina Piątek contains the villages and settlements of Balków, Bielice, Boguszyce, Borowiec, Broników, Czerników, Górki Łubnickie, Górki Pęcławskie, Goślub, Goślub-Osada, Janków, Janówek, Janowice, Jasionna, Konarzew, Krzyszkowice, Łęka, Leżajna, Łubnica, Mchowice, Michałówka, Młynów, Mysłówka, Orądki, Orenice, Pęcławice, Piątek, Piekary, Pokrzywnica, Rogaszyn, Śladków Podleśny, Śladków Rozlazły, Stare Piaski, Sułkowice Drugie, Sułkowice Pierwsze, Sypin, Witów, Włostowice, Włostowice-Parcele and Żabokrzeki.

Neighbouring gminas
Gmina Piątek is bordered by the gminas of Bedlno, Bielawy, Głowno, Góra Świętej Małgorzaty, Krzyżanów and Zgierz.

References
Polish official population figures 2006

Piatek
Łęczyca County